Artur "Art" Binkowski (born February 19, 1975) is a Polish-born Canadian heavyweight boxer who competed for his adoptive country Canada at the 2000 Summer Olympics in Sydney, Australia.

Background
Binkowski came to Canada from Poland at the age of 13. He studied psychology at the University of Waterloo.

Amateur career
Binkowski was Ontario amateur heavyweight champion for 6 years. He took part in the Olympics 2000 at superheavyweight. There he was defeated in the quarterfinals by Uzbekistan's Rustam Saidov.

Professional career
Nicknamed "The Polish Warrior", the resident of Mississauga, Ontario, made his debut as a professional on November 23, 2001, in Southfield, Michigan, against Michael Moncrief of the United States.

In 2005 Binkowski lost to a lightly regarded countryman Patrice L'Heureux.
Although Binkowski sported the better record, he came in as an underdog against hard-hitting American amateur star Rafael Butler on ShoBox in April 2007. He hit the deck three times in the first round but scored a stunning come-from-behind TKO in the final round of their bout.

Binkowski was crushed in a 2nd round TKO loss to Mike Mollo in October 2007.

On 19 October 2013, Binkowski was defeated by Krzysztof Zimnoch in Poland, Wieliczka.

Outside the ring
He also played the boxer John 'Corn' Griffin in the movie "Cinderella Man", starring Russell Crowe.

See also
 List of University of Waterloo people

External links
 
 Art Binkowski @ Internet Movie Database

1975 births
Living people
Heavyweight boxers
Boxers at the 2000 Summer Olympics
Boxing people from Ontario
Canadian male boxers
Olympic boxers of Canada
Polish emigrants to Canada
People from Bielawa
Polish male boxers
Sportspeople from Lower Silesian Voivodeship
Sportspeople from Mississauga